The Helpmann Award for Best Female Actor in a Play is an award presented by Live Performance Australia (LPA) (the trade name for the Australian Entertainment Industry Association (AEIA)), an employers' organisation which serves as the peak body in the live entertainment and performing arts industries in Australia. The accolade is handed out at the annual Helpmann Awards, which celebrates achievements in musical theatre, contemporary music, comedy, opera, classical music, theatre, dance and physical theatre.

Cate Blanchett has the most wins in this category with four, for Hedda Gabler, Uncle Vanya, Gross und Klein (Big and Small) and The Maids.

Winners and nominees
In the following list winners are listed first and marked in gold, in boldface, and the nominees are listed below with no highlight.

Source:

See also
Helpmann Awards

Notes

A: Caroline O'Connor played six characters in the play Bombshells: Meryl Davenport, Tiggy Entwhistle, Mary O’Donnell, Theresa McTerry, Winsome Webster and Zoe Struthers.
B: In The Blue Room, Sigrid Thornton portrayed the female characters: Irene, Marie, Emma, Kelly and the Actress.

References

External links
The official Helpmann Awards website

P
Awards for actresses